is a Japanese essayist and Suntory employee. She is a graduate of Seijo University's School of Literature.

She is a daughter of novelist Morio Kita, a niece of psychiatrist Shigeta Saitō and a granddaughter of poet Mokichi Saitō.

Bibliography 
 Madogiwa OL Tohoho na Asa Ufufu no Yoru (Shinchosha)
 Manga serialization in Manga Time (Manga by Nobu Ueda, Houbunsha)
 Madogiwa OL Kaisha wa Itsu mo Ten'yawan'ya (Shinchosha)
 Mota Sensei to Madogiwa OL no Hitodukiai ga Raku ni Naru Hon (work with Shigeta Saitō, Shueisha)
 Mōjo to Yobareta Shukujo: Sobo Saitō Teruko no Ikikata (Shinchosha)
 Madogiwa OL Oya to Jōshi wa Erabenai (Shinchosha)
 Papa wa Tanoshii Sōutubyō (work with Morio Kita, Asahi Shimbun Company)
 Madogiwa OL Jinjikou-ka de Gakeppuchi (Shinchosha)

TV 
 Tetsuko no Heya (May 12, 2008 with Morio Kita)

See also 
 Sawako Agawa

External links 
 Interview with Yuka Saitō 

1962 births
Living people
Japanese essayists
Seijo University alumni
People from Tokyo
Suntory